George Levendis (Greek: Γιώργος Λεβέντης), is a Greek-Australian Global Television and record executive and is currently the Executive Producer and Show-Runner of Red Bull's The Cut. Prior to this, he was the COO of Acun Medya Global, focused on expanding TV formats internationally. From 2011 to 2018 he was Head of International for Syco TV, a joint venture between Simon Cowell and Sony Music Entertainment. In this role he has been responsible for the international expansion of The X Factor and Got Talent as well working on Red or Black?, Keep It in the Family, The Investigator and Food Glorious Food. During his tenure at Syco, Got Talent and The X Factor grew rapidly internationally. Got Talent has been produced in over 70 markets and The X Factor was sold to over 56 markets globally.

Prior to this he was general manager of the Greek television network ANT1 the number 2 station in the Greek market and the largest Greek satellite station worldwide.
 
Over the last 20 years, Levendis has held Senior Management and International Marketing positions at a number of record companies, including Arista Records, Arista Records U.K., BMG Greece, BMG Australia, Heaven Music, and culminating as Senior Vice President of Sony BMG Global Marketing at the headquarters of Sony BMG in New York City. In this position, he oversaw worldwide campaigns for artists including Beyoncé, Justin Timberlake, Pink, Shakira, Foo Fighters, Kings of Leon, Leona Lewis, Il Divo and Westlife.
 
Under his control, Heaven Music was built into one of Greece's most successful independent music companies.

He has been a judge on three seasons (2002-2004) of the Greek reality Fame Story (Star Academy) and three seasons (2008-2010) of The X Factor in Greece. In February 2011, he was the winning judge after three consecutive seasons on the Greek version of The X Factor.

Background
George Levendis was born to Greek parents originating from Ithaca and Arcadia. He worked as a DJ from a young age and worked in the family business LEVENDI Jewellers. He attended Sydney Boys High School. and then pursued a Bachelor of Arts degree in Psychology at the University of New South Wales and in 1992 graduated with a Master of Commerce in Marketing. He continued his further education graduating with a Master of Arts in Media Management from Macquarie University's Graduate School of Management in 1994.

Levendis started out at BMG Australia in 1989, where he worked across all marketing and artist development divisions culminating in becoming General Manager of Marketing in 1994. In 1995, Levendis left BMG Australia for Arista Records U.K., where he served as marketing director. In 1997, he took over as General Manager/Managing Director at BMG Greece. In 1999, he moved to Arista Records in New York where he served as Vice President of International Worldwide Marketing under Clive Davis, eventually being promoted to Senior Vice President of Marketing in 2001 under Antonio "LA" Reid. While at Arista, Levendis helped capitalize on artists' global presence, as well as convincing international labels to release albums from Arista artists. He also oversaw the international marketing campaigns for Carlos Santana's Supernatural, Whitney Houston's My Love is Your Love and Whitney: The Greatest Hits, TLC's FanMail, and Pink's Can't Take Me Home among others.

In 2002, Levendis was hired as Managing Director/CEO with the launching of the Greek independent label Heaven Music, owned by ANT1 Group, which he helped build into one of Greece's most successful independent music companies, simultaneously serving as a judge on ANT1's singing competition show Fame Story. He remained with Heaven Music and Fame Story until 2005, when he was hired by Sony BMG's global headquarters in New York to serve as Senior Vice President of Sony BMG Global Marketing Group.

In 2008, Levendis was named General Manager of ANT1, and the same year he began to serve as a judge on Greece's The X Factor. Over this period Levendis repositioned Antenna as the most contemporary station in the Greek market. The rebranding strategy which included new logo, complete station makeover and a new internet strategy catapulted Antenna into a new era. High rating shows included Ellada Eheis Talento (English: Greece Got Talent), Greece's Next Top Model, Greek series of Dancing with the Stars, The X Factor, Radio Arvyla, Wipeout, The Next Uri Geller, Greys Anatomy, Ola, Axizis na to deis, and the morning show 10 to 1. Antenna entered the sports domain broadcasting Formula One, Greek A1 Basket League, for the 2009 season and the UEFA Europa League for three consecutive years.

On The X Factor, Levendis was characterized as the "good judge" and endeared himself to the Greek public with a professional, honest and humane judging style

In 2011, he joined Simon Cowell as Head of International overseeing Syco's international business.

Personal life
Levendis met his wife Maria Mentis, a Greek-Australian, while living in Australia. They have 3 children together, twins, born in Manhattan NYC and a son born in Athens, Greece. Having completed her studies in Fashion Technology and Design, her career path included fashion retail area management, fashion merchandising, fashion buying. She was the owner of a fashion business in Sydney, Australia.

Maria Mentis-Levendis was on the board of directors of the Make a Wish Foundation in Greece and played an integral part in the marketing and public relations of the charity. Make A Wish is the selected charity for Greece's high rating show Dancing with the Stars. Maria continues to be an active supporter of the charity both in Greece and the United Kingdom. Throughout their expat assignments, Maria has used her creative and management skills in various roles including creative styling, interior design and event management.

See also
Heaven Music

References

Living people
ANT1 Group
Australian music industry executives
University of New South Wales alumni
Heaven Music
People educated at Sydney Boys High School
Year of birth missing (living people)